Bloomfield High School may refer to:

Canada
Bloomfield High School (Halifax, Nova Scotia), Halifax, Nova Scotia

United States

Bloomfield High School (Connecticut), Bloomfield, Connecticut, US
Bloomfield High School (Bloomfield, Nebraska), Bloomfield, Nebraska, US
Bloomfield High School (Bloomfield, Indiana), Bloomfield, Indiana, US
Bloomfield High School (Bloomfield, Missouri), Bloomfield, Missouri, US
Bloomfield High School (New Jersey), Bloomfield, New Jersey, US
Bloomfield High School (Bloomfield, New Mexico), Bloomfield, New Mexico, US
Bloomfield High School (Bloomfield, New York), Bloomfield, New York, US
Bloomfield High School (North Bloomfield, Ohio), North Bloomfield, Ohio, US